The yellow bullhead (Ameiurus natalis) is a species of bullhead catfish, a ray-finned fish that lacks scales.

Description
The yellow bullhead is a medium-sized member of the catfish family. It is typically yellow-olive to slate black on the back and may appear mottled depending on its habitat. The sides are lighter and more yellowish, while the underside of the head and body are bright yellow, yellow white, or bright white. The rear edge of its caudal fin is rounded. The anal fin is much longer than those of other bullheads, having anywhere between 24 and 27 rays. The yellow bullhead, though less common, can be easily distinguished from the brown bullhead (Ameiurus nebulosus) and black bullhead (A. melas) by the group of white barbels or "whiskers" under its chin. Yellow bullheads range in size from 6 to 14 inches, and can live up to 12 years.

Diet
The yellow bullhead is a voracious scavenger that will almost eat anything. It locates prey by brushing the stream bottom with its barbels. Taste buds on the barbels tell the yellow bullhead whether or not contact is made with edible prey. They typically feed at night on a variety of plant and animal material, both live and dead, most commonly consisting of worms, insects, snails, minnows, clams, crayfish, other small aquatic organisms, plant matter, and decaying animal matter. Compared to black and brown bullheads, yellow bullheads consume more aquatic vegetation.

Habitat
Yellow bullhead are bottom dwellers, living in areas with muck, rock, sand, or clay substrates. Its habitat includes river pools, backwaters, and sluggish current over soft or mildly rocky substrate in creeks, small to larger rivers, and shallow portions of lakes and ponds. Their habitat can vary from a slow current with poorly oxygenated, highly silted, and highly polluted water to a more swift current with clean and clear water that has aquatic vegetation. Fishermen often find them in sluggish creeks and rivers with a gravel bottom.

Reproduction and life cycle
Bullheads have a monogamous relationship with spawning beginning in mid-May or early-June, with both sexes participating in nest-building. Bullheads usually use a natural cavity or make saucer-shaped depressions near submerged cover, such as tree roots or sunken logs. The female will lay anywhere from 300 to 700 eggs at a time in a gelatinous mass, with up to 4300 eggs deposited into the nest in total. After fertilization the male protects and continually fans the nest of eggs. The eggs hatch in 5 to 7 days on average. Young fry are herded into tight schools by the male and are protected by both parents until they are approximately two inches long. They grow to about three inches by one year of age. Sexual maturity is achieved after two to three years, by which time the fish have reached  in length.

Distribution
Yellow bullhead have a wide range across the central and eastern US from the Rio Grande River to North Dakota and south-eastern Canada, and east through the Great Lakes region to the East Coast.  They have also been introduced to the West and can be caught as far up as northern Washington state.

Angling
Yellow bullheads are considered a minor game fish, and their meat is considered sweet and has a good flavor, but the meat can become soft in summer. They are not as sought after as other catfish. They can be caught on natural baits such as worms, crickets or chicken liver fished on the bottom at night.

Etymology
Named both Ictalurus natalis and Ameiurus natalis. Ictalurus, Greek, meaning "fish cat"; Ameiurus, Greek, meaning "privative curtailed," in reference to the caudal fin lacking a notch; natalis, Latin, meaning "of birth."

See also
 Bullhead catfish (general)

References

Other sources

External links
 Montana Fish, Wildlife and Parks Guide
 Animal Diversity Web
 Minnesota Fish, Department of Natural Resources
 Ohio Fish Department of Natural Resources
 

Ameiurus
Freshwater fish of the United States
Fish of Canada
Fish of the Eastern United States
Fish of the Great Lakes
Freshwater fish of the Southeastern United States
Fish described in 1819
Taxa named by Charles Alexandre Lesueur